Borovnička is a municipality and village in Trutnov District in the Hradec Králové Region of the Czech Republic. It has about 200 inhabitants.

Notable people
Naďa Urbánková (1939–2023), singer and actress; grew up here

References

Villages in Trutnov District